Candyman is a single by Australian indie pop band Ratcat, released in May 1992 as the lead single from the band's third studio album, Insideout. In 2006 the song was resurrected by Andy Batavick and became a local hit in the Washington, D.C. area.

Track listing
 CD-Single (rooArt 4509904362) 
 "Candyman" - 2:50	
 "Another Planet" - 3:51	
 "Kitten" - 3:38	
 "Puppet" - 3:16

Charts
"Candyman" debuted at No.44 and peaked at No.38 three weeks later.

Weekly charts

Release history

References

1992 songs
1992 singles